Thomas J. Adkins (born May 7, 1932) was an American gridiron football center and linebacker who played for the Toronto Argonauts of the Canadian Football League (CFL). He played 12 regular season games and made two interceptions during the 1954 season. Prior to playing for the Argonauts, Adkins was drafted in the 17th round of the 1954 NFL Draft by the Baltimore Colts with the 197th overall pick. He never played with the Colts during the regular season.

References

1932 births
Living people
American football centers
American football linebackers
Kentucky Wildcats football players
Baltimore Colts players
American players of Canadian football
Canadian football centres
Canadian football linebackers
Toronto Argonauts players